Jeff Shoate (born March 23, 1981) is a former American football cornerback. He was drafted by the Denver Broncos in the fifth round of the 2004 NFL Draft. He played college football at San Diego State.

Shoate has also been a member of the Baltimore Ravens, New York Giants, New England Patriots and Detroit Lions. He earned a Super Bowl ring as a member of the Giants' practice squad in Super Bowl XLII.

Early years
Shoate attended Junípero Serra High School in San Diego, California where he played football as a quarterback and defensive back. Shoate also lettered in basketball and track and field as a hurdler.

College career
Shoate played at the University of Montana in 1999 and San Diego State University from 2001-2003, recording 157 career tackles, seven interceptions, 28 pass breakups and five forced fumbles.

Professional career

Denver Broncos
Shoate was drafted by the Broncos in the fifth round of the 2004 NFL Draft and was on the Broncos' roster for the entire 2004 season. Shoate then missed all of the 2005 season while on injured reserve before being waived by the Broncos after the 2006 preseason. He was re-signed to the Broncos' practice squad, where he spent the whole 2006 season until being re-signed to a futures contract on January 6, 2007. Shoate began the 2007 season on the Broncos' roster but was released on December 4, 2007.

Baltimore Ravens
On December 12, 2007, Shoate was signed to the Ravens' practice squad and spent the remainder of the regular season with the team.

New York Giants
The Giants signed Shoate to their practice squad on January 8, 2008, where he stayed until his contract expired following Super Bowl XLII.

New England Patriots
Shoate was signed by the Patriots on August 9, 2008 after safety Tank Williams was placed on injured reserve.

Detroit Lions
Shoate was signed to the practice squad of the Detroit Lions on December 18, 2008.

External links
Denver Broncos bio
New England Patriots bio
New York Giants bio

1981 births
Living people
Players of American football from San Diego
American football cornerbacks
American football safeties
Montana Grizzlies football players
San Diego State Aztecs football players
Denver Broncos players
Baltimore Ravens players
New York Giants players
New England Patriots players
Detroit Lions players